Krasna may refer to:

Krásná (Cheb District), Czech Republic
Krásná (Frýdek-Místek District), Czech Republic
Krasna, Cieszyn, Poland
Krasna, Masovian Voivodeship, east-central Poland
Krasna, Subcarpathian Voivodeship, south-east Poland
Krasna, Świętokrzyskie Voivodeship, south-central Poland
Krasna, West Pomeranian Voivodeship, north-west Poland
Krasna, Slovenia
Krasna, Nadvirna Raion, near Nadvirna, Ivano-Frankivsk Oblast, Ukraine

See also
 Krasne (disambiguation)
 Krasno (disambiguation)